The Eiserner Steg (Iron Footbridge) is a footbridge spanning the river Main in the city of Frankfurt, Germany, which connects the centre of Frankfurt with the district of Sachsenhausen.

The first wrought iron bridge was built in 1868. It was replaced in 1911/1912 by a slightly larger cantilever bridge. It is 170 metres long and consists of riveted steel trusses with two bridge piers. The bridge was blown up by the Wehrmacht in the final days of World War II, but it was rebuilt shortly afterwards in 1946. It was fully renovated in 1993.

Bibliography

See also
 Alte Brücke (Frankfurt)

References

Further reading 
 

Buildings and structures in Frankfurt
Cantilever bridges
Bridges in Germany
Tourist attractions in Frankfurt